
American Presbyterian/Reformed Historic Sites Registry is a heritage register of sites recognized by the Presbyterian Historical Society.

A list of all sites is provided by the Presbyterian Historical Society.

List

to be checked
Historic sites on the registry include:
numerous ones on List of Presbyterian churches in Pennsylvania
371 Sand Spring Presbyterian Church
323 First Presbyterian Church of Salt Lake City

See also
List of heritage registers

References

Heritage registers